Toxicodendron pubescens (syn. Rhus pubescens), commonly known as Atlantic poison oak, is an upright shrub that can grow to 1 metre (3 feet) tall. Its leaves are 15 centimetres (6 inches) long, alternate, with three leaflets on each. The leaflets are usually hairy and are variable in size and shape, but most often resemble white oak leaves; they usually turn yellow or orange in autumn. The fruit is small, round, and yellowish or greenish. It is not closely related to true oaks.

Distribution and habitat
This species is native to the Southeastern United States from Virginia westward to Texas and Oklahoma.

Atlantic poison oak can be found growing in forests, thickets, and dry, sandy fields.

Toxicity

All parts of this plant contain urushiol, which can cause severe dermatitis in sensitive individuals. The risk of exposure may be reduced by learning to recognize and avoid this species and wearing clothing that covers the legs and arms. Contaminated clothing should be laundered before subsequent handling or use.

Effects of poison oak are similar to those of poison ivy. It first causes severe itching, evolves into inflammation, non-colored bumps, and then blistering when scratched.

See also
 Poison sumac
 Western poison oak

References

External links
See Tecnu skin cleanser Wikipedia

 All about Eastern Poison Oak

pubescens
Flora of the Southeastern United States
Flora of the United States
Plants described in 1768
Taxa named by Philip Miller